Saint-Étienne-du-Bois is a commune in the Vendée department in the Pays de la Loire region in western France.

Places and Monuments

The Chapel of Tulévrière 

In the hamlet of Tulévrière, stands a small chapel, only monument Catholic erected during the Vendée wars . It was erected by the inhabitants of the locality, at the request of the priest Alexandre Ténèbre, refractory priest in 1794 who gave it the name "Our Lady of Martyrs of Lower Poitou".

Inaugurated on 29 December 1794, it was intended to thank the Virgin of the protection afforded to the village during the passage of infernal columns in March of that year.

Rebuilt in 1835, it was decorated with stained glass for the occasion

See also
Communes of the Vendée department

References

Communes of Vendée